Whiteface is a town in Cochran County, Texas, United States. The population was 449 at the 2010 census.

History 
According to the Handbook of Texas, "The name of the town came from rancher C. C. Slaughter's Whiteface Camp and Whiteface Pasture, which were named in turn for the cattle on his ranch." By 1924, Slaughter's son-in-law, Ira P. DeLoache, turned the ranch into the new community of Whiteface.

The community was moved several miles the next year to be at the railroad. Oil was discovered near the town in 1937. It was incorporated in 1945.

Geography

Whiteface is located on the high plains of the Llano Estacado at  (33.6000974, –102.6138084).

Demographics

2020 census

As of the 2020 United States census, there were 375 people, 133 households, and 98 families residing in the town.

2000 census
As of the census of 2000,  465 people, 163 households, and 125 families resided in the town. The population density was 799.8 people per square mile (309.5/km). The 207 housing units averaged 356.0 per square mile (137.8/km). The racial makeup of the town was 67.53% White, 2.80% African American, 2.58% Native American, 26.45% from other races, and 0.65% from two or more races. Hispanics or Latinos of any race were 45.16% of the population.

Of the 163 households, 47.2% had children under the age of 18 living with them, 59.5% were married couples living together, 10.4% had a female householder with no husband present, and 23.3% were not families. About 22.1% of all households were made up of individuals, and 10.4% had someone living alone who was 65 years of age or older. The average household size was 2.85 and the average family size was 3.37.

In the town, the population was distributed as 35.1% under the age of 18, 6.7% from 18 to 24, 31.8% from 25 to 44, 16.3% from 45 to 64, and 10.1% who were 65 years of age or older. The median age was 33 years. For every 100 females, there were 91.4 males. For every 100 females age 18 and over, there were 92.4 males.

Males had a median income of $27,321 versus $17,500 for females. The per capita income for the town was $15,060. About 10.8% of families and 14.4% of the population were below the poverty line, including 20.4% of those under age 18 and 13.7% of those age 65 or over.

Education
The city of Whiteface is served by the Whiteface Consolidated Independent School District and home to the Whiteface High School Antelopes.

See also
Morton, Texas
Muleshoe National Wildlife Refuge
Eastern New Mexico
Llano Estacado

References

External links

Towns in Cochran County, Texas
Towns in Texas
Populated places established in 1924
1924 establishments in Texas